The Dalton House in Garrard County, Kentucky, located on Kentucky Route 39 near Lancaster, was built in 1820.  It was listed on the National Register of Historic Places in 1985.

It is a one-story, five-bay, brick Federal-style house with a porch added in the 1900s.

References

Houses on the National Register of Historic Places in Kentucky
Federal architecture in Kentucky
Houses completed in 1820
Houses in Garrard County, Kentucky
National Register of Historic Places in Garrard County, Kentucky
1820 establishments in Kentucky